Waleed Jumaa (Arabic:وليد جمعة) (born 15 August 1993) is an Emirati footballer. He currently plays as a defender.

References

External links
 

Emirati footballers
1993 births
Living people
Al-Ittihad Kalba SC players
Emirates Club players
Dibba Al-Hisn Sports Club players
Masfout Club players
Al Dhaid SC players
Association football defenders
UAE First Division League players
UAE Pro League players